The Market Weighton School is a coeducational secondary school located in Market Weighton in the East Riding of Yorkshire, England.

It is a community school administered by East Riding of Yorkshire Council. The school offers GCSEs and BTECs as programmes of study for pupils.

References

External links
The Market Weighton School official website

Secondary schools in the East Riding of Yorkshire
Community schools in the East Riding of Yorkshire
Market Weighton